Fielder Allison Jones (August 13, 1871 – March 13, 1934) was an American center fielder and manager in Major League Baseball (MLB). He was best known as the player-manager of the World Series champion 1906 Chicago White Sox, a team who succeeded in spite of such poor offense that they were known as the "Hitless Wonders".

Early life
Born in Shinglehouse, Pennsylvania to a father who owned a general store, Jones learned to play baseball at his preparatory school at Alfred University. As a young man, Jones worked as a surveyor with his brother and ventured to the Pacific Northwest by 1891.

Playing career
Jones entered professional baseball playing as an outfielder and catcher for Portland in the Oregon State League in 1891 or 1893, depending on the source. He played minor league ball in Binghamton, New York and Springfield Massachusetts, where he was an accomplished hitter.

Jones's major league playing career began with the Brooklyn Bridegrooms in 1896. In , he joined the Chicago White Sox in the new American League. Jones managed the "Hitless Wonders" in the 1906 World Series, which was the White Sox' first World Series win. Playing in that World Series, he hit only .143 (3-for-21) but scored 4 runs and stole 3 bases. That year, the White Sox had a team batting average of only .230.

Jones was head coach for the Oregon State Beavers baseball team in 1910, going 13–4–1 and winning the Northwest championship. Six years after his last game with the White Sox, he joined the St. Louis Terriers of the newly formed Federal League, where he served as a player-manager before the league folded. He had one last stint as a manager with the St. Louis Browns, but his earlier success with the White Sox eluded him, as his St. Louis teams never finished above fifth place.

In 1,788 major-league games over 15 seasons, Jones posted a .285 batting average (1,920-for-6,747) with 1,180 runs, 206 doubles, 75 triples, 21 home runs, 631 RBI, 359 stolen bases, 817 bases on balls, .368 on-base percentage and .347 slugging percentage. He finished his career with a .962 fielding percentage.

Later life
Jones died of heart disease in Portland, Oregon, at age 62.

Managerial record

See also
 List of Major League Baseball career runs scored leaders
 List of Major League Baseball career stolen bases leaders
 List of Major League Baseball player-managers

References

External links

1871 births
1934 deaths
19th-century baseball players
Major League Baseball center fielders
Baseball players from Pennsylvania
Brooklyn Bridegrooms players
Brooklyn Superbas players
Burials at Portland Memorial Mausoleum
Chicago White Sox players
St. Louis Terriers players
Major League Baseball player-managers
Chicago White Sox managers
St. Louis Terriers managers
St. Louis Browns managers
Minor league baseball managers
Binghamton Bingoes players
Allentown Buffaloes players
Hartford Bluebirds players
Chehalis Gophers players
Oregon State Beavers baseball coaches
World Series-winning managers